António Reginaldo Matias de Araújo  (2 October 1977 – 11 January 2016), or simply  Reginaldo Araújo, was a Brazilian footballer who played at right-back.

Playing career
Starting his career at Matsubara, Araújo joined Coritiba in 1997. Having success at Coritiba, he was called up by Brazil U-23 team challenging for a spot in the squad that played the 2000 Olympic Games. He joined São Paulo in 2001, but after an unsuccessful year, he returned to Coritiba in 2002.

Araújo was signed by Santos, who were the current national champions. He was a 2003 Copa Libertadores runner-up and was sent off in the first leg of the final against Boca Juniors. He moved to Flamengo in 2004, where he was a 2004 Copa do Brasil runner-up.

He later had spells at Noroeste and Santa Cruz before a spell in Portugal with S.C. Beira-Mar. Reginaldo Araújo moved back to Brazil to play for Criciúma and returned to Paraná state in his last career years.

Retirement
He retired in 2010 after discovering a heart condition and worked with the youth team and as a director of football at Corinthians Paulista and was appointed as an assistant manager of PSTC in December 2015.

Death
On 11 January 2016, he died after suffering a heart attack during a training of PSTC.

References

External links
Player profile - Beiramar.pt

1977 births
2016 deaths
Brazilian footballers
Coritiba Foot Ball Club players
São Paulo FC players
Santos FC players
CR Flamengo footballers
Esporte Clube Noroeste players
Santa Cruz Futebol Clube players
S.C. Beira-Mar players
People from Presidente Prudente, São Paulo
Association football fullbacks
Footballers from São Paulo (state)